Gibton (lit. Finch) is a moshav in central Israel. Located near Rehovot, it falls under the jurisdiction of Brenner Regional Council.

History
It was founded in 1933 as part of the Settlement of the Thousand plan. The plan aimed to establish small agricultural settlements around the larger towns and help defend them against Arab rioters. It was named after an ancient town in the territory of the Tribe of Dan which is mentioned in the Tanakh (Joshua 19:44) and is identified with Tel Malot some kilometers south-east. Following Rehovot's expansion after the 1948 Arab–Israeli War, it became an enclave within the city's perimeter.

References

Moshavim
Populated places established in 1933
Populated places in Central District (Israel)
1933 establishments in Mandatory Palestine